General the Honourable Sir John Francis Gathorne-Hardy,  (14 January 1874 – 21 August 1949), was a British First World War General officer who served in Italy and the Western Front.

Background and early life
Gathorne-Hardy was born in 1874, a younger son of John Gathorne-Hardy, 2nd Earl of Cranbrook, and Cicely Marguerite Wilhelmina Ridgway. He was educated at Eton and the Royal Military College, Sandhurst.

Military career
Gathorne-Hardy joined the British Army as a commissioned second lieutenant in the Grenadier Guards on 10 October 1894, and was promoted to lieutenant on 1 January 1898. In early February 1900 he was seconded for special service in South Africa, where he was involved with Army transport duties during the Second Boer War. He was promoted to captain on 2 May 1900. During later stages of the war he served with the Lovat Scouts, and only left South Africa after the war had ended, in July 1902. For his service in the war he received the brevet rank of major on 22 August 1902. Following his return he was appointed Superintendent of Gymnasia in the Home District in October 1902.

He served as a General Staff Officer in the First World War. After commands as a General in Egypt and India, he was Commander in Chief at Northern Command from 1931 to 1933 and at Aldershot Command from 1933 to 1937.

Family
Gathorne-Hardy married Lady Isobel Constance Mary Stanley, daughter of Frederick Stanley, 16th Earl of Derby and Lady Constance Villiers, on 10 December 1898.

References

 

|-
 

1874 births
1949 deaths
British Army generals
People educated at Eton College
Graduates of the Royal Military College, Sandhurst
British Army personnel of the Second Boer War
British Army generals of World War I
Knights Grand Cross of the Order of the Bath
Knights Grand Cross of the Royal Victorian Order
Companions of the Order of St Michael and St George
Companions of the Distinguished Service Order
Grenadier Guards officers
Younger sons of earls